When the Heart Burns with Hate (German: Wenn das Herz in Haß erglüht) is a 1917 German silent romantic drama film directed by Kurt Matull and starring Pola Negri and Hans Adalbert Schlettow.

Cast
 Pola Negri as Ilja Vörösz
 Hans Adalbert Schlettow as Graf von Hohenau	
 Harry Hopkins as Zirkusdirektor Hopkins
 Magnus Stifter as Baron Ilfingen
 Anna von Palen as Baronin Ilfingen
 Tilli Bébé

References

Bibliography
 Mariusz Kotowski. Pola Negri: Hollywood's First Femme Fatale. University Press of Kentucky, 2014.

External links

1917 films
Films of the German Empire
German silent feature films
Films directed by Kurt Matull
German black-and-white films
German romance films
1910s romance films
1910s German films
1910s German-language films